Chengbei is a township of Liangping County in northern Chongqing Municipality, People's Republic of China, located about  north of the county seat as its name suggests. , it has 8 villages under its administration.

References 

Townships of Chongqing